Donald Henry Kay AM (born 25 January 1933) is an Australian classical composer.

Kay was born on 25 January 1933 in Smithton, Tasmania. He attained a Bachelor of Music degree at the University of Melbourne after which he taught music at Colac High School, Victoria, 1957–59. He then went on to teach music at Peckham Manor Comprehensive School for Boys, London, UK 1959-64 and was Director of Music there 1962–64. He studied composition privately at this time with Malcolm Williamson. His first publication was in 1964–65 with Songs of Come and Gone for choir, flute, piano and string orchestra.

Kay returned to Tasmania in 1965 with a young family of two daughters as Lecturer of Music, Hobart Teachers College; in 1967 he was appointed Lecturer of Composition and Music Education, Tasmanian Conservatorium of Music. He received his first commission in 1966, Organ Sonata, broadcast on ABC national radio by John Nicholls, the Hobart City Organist, in 1967. Active as a music tutor from the late 1960s to the middle 1970s with the Tasmanian Youth Theatre, Secheron House, Battery Point, Kay also composed a number of scores for production by the Tasmanian Puppet Theatre as well as Theatre Royal professional productions e.g. Richard II (Shakespeare), The Imaginary Invalid (Molière), the Wakefield Miracle Plays (Tasmania Festival, 1970) at that time. In 1984 Kay wrote an opera The Golden Crane with a libretto from Gwen Harwood.

During these years Kay was also contributing to Creative Music and Arts workshops at National and International conferences for Music and Arts Education. He was appointed Senior Lecturer at the Tasmanian Conservatorium of Music in 1976; elected Dean of Music, University of Tasmania, 1989; and elected Head of the Conservatorium of Music, University of Tasmania, 1990.

Kay has had over 50 compositions broadcast on ABC national radio and over 60 works publicly performed in Australia, UK, US, Switzerland and Italy from a symphony, to operas, orchestral and choral works to chamber and solo works.

In 1989 Tasmania Symphony - The Legend of Moinee for cello and orchestra was awarded the best composition by a composer resident in Tasmania in the Sounds Australian awards.

In 1990 Dance Concertante for String Orchestra was given a similar award.

Kay's music in recent years has been largely the result of a variety of responses to Tasmanian ecology and history.

In June 1991 Don Kay was appointed a Member of the Order of Australia for his contribution to the arts and particularly to music composition. In 2001 he was awarded a Centenary Medal for an outstanding contribution to music, music education and composing in Tasmania.

He retired from the staff of the Tasmanian Conservatorium of Music in 1998, having served as head of department from 1990 to 1993 and has since been appointed adjunct professor in composition. He now composes full-time.

Works

Chamber

 Sextet, flute, violin, trumpet, viola, tenor trombone, xylophone 1962
 Trio, flute, oboe, harpsichord 1962
 Aubade, viola d'amore, piano 1964
 Three Bagatelles, violin, viola, cello 1964
 Six Miniatures for Piano Trio, violin, cello, piano 1967
 Elegy, violin, viola, cello 1970
 String Quartet 1 - 'The Quest 1971
 Quintet for Flute and Strings 1974
 Three Canzonas, flute, viola 1974
 Proclamation Music, flute, oboe, clarinet, horn, bassoon 1975
 String Quartet 2 1975
 String Quartet 3 1978
 Scherzando for Two Pianos 1979
 Five Piano Duets for young players 1979
 Rapunzel – Paraphrase, violin, piano, narrator 1982
 Two ensemble pieces for keyboard players 1982
 The Waking of the World (String Quartet 4), string quartet, narrator 1984
 Evocations, clarinet, violin, piano 1985
 Rhapsody, violin, piano 1986
 Dance Cameos, mandolin, wind quintet 1986
 Hastings Triptych, flute, piano 1986
 Seasons, voice, violin, piano 1989
 Night Spaces, flute, violin, viola, cello, piano 1989
 Birthday Flourish, string quartet 1990
 Dance, violin, piano 1992
 Duo Pastorales, violin, clarinet 1993
 Love Voice of Moinee, cello, piano 1993
 Coolness, clarinet, voice, piano 1994
 Aestivernal, mandolin, wind quintet 1994
 Epitaph for Alfred, violin, piano 1994
 Concert Music for Viola and String Orchestra, rehearsal score (piano) 1994
 All through the night, violin, piano 1996
 Serenade, violin, cello, piano 1996
 Prelude, violin, piano 1996
 Victory Tango, clarinet, piano 1996
 Piano Trio - The Edge of Remoteness, violin, cello, piano 1996
 Saxophone Dances, saxophone quartet 1997
 Wild Call, oboe, clarinet, string trio 1998
 Scherzando, 2 pianos 1998
 Sonata for Cello and Piano, cello, piano 1999
 Blue Sky through Still Trees, flute, piano 1999
 Little Domestic Suite, oboe, clarinet, string trio 1999
 Memento Mori, string quartet 2000
 Meditation on Prelude IX, 48 Preludes & Fugues (Bk.1) by J.S.Bach, 2 pianos, vibraphone 2000
 Borders Within, violin, cello, percussion 2000
 String Quartet 5 - 'A Tragic Life, 2 violins, viola, cello 2001
 Two Southern Pieces, flute, piano 2001
 Memento Mori, violin, cello, piano 2001
 String Quartet 6 - 'On Truganini Track, 2 violins, viola, cello 2003
 Piano Trio - 'The Span of Time, violin, cello, piano 2004
 Cape Bernier, violin, cello, piano 2006
 Five Short Pieces, violin, piano 2006
 Summer Music, 2 recorders, baroque oboe, harpsichord 2007
 Wild Song, violin, piano 2008
 Dance Prelude, piccolo, piano 2008
 Sleeping Water, alto saxophone, piano 2009
 Sonata for Violin and Piano 2009
 Epitomes, clarinet, piano 2009
 Romance, viola, double bass 2009
 Mathinna's Lullaby, oboe, piano 2009
 Lamentation, brass quintet 2010
 ...the soft dying day, cello, piano 2010
 Triptych, alto saxophone, piano 2014
 Milestone Tribute, alto saxophone, piano 2018
 Update hybrid, flute, clarinet, alto saxophone, trumpet, trombone, percussion, piano 2019
 Allegory, cello, piano 2020

Large Ensemble

 Variations, string orchestra 1963
 Practice Piece No.1, winds and strings 1968
 Three Pieces for String Orchestra 1969
 Practice Piece No.2, treble instruments/voices/tuned and non-tuned percussion, keyboard, bass instruments 1970
 Fanfare, double brass choir 1976
 Three ensemble pieces for young string players, string ensemble 1981
 Spiritual, 8 trombones 1994
 Rondino, string ensemble 1997
 Mathinna in the Red Dress, string orchestra 2007
 Spiritual, 10 saxophones 2010

Concertante

 Dance Movement, orchestra 1968
 Dance Episodes, orchestra 1973
 Concert Music, viola, orchestra 1973
 Concerto for Violin and Orchestra 1982
 Overture - The Inward Light, concert band 1986
 Dance Concertante, string orchestra 1989
 Concerto for Piano and Orchestra 1992
 River Views, trombone, string orchestra 1995
 Two Views from Hastings: Moonlight Ridge/Bush Tapestry, string quintet/orchestra 1994–97
 Rondino, string ensemble 1997
 Concertino for Clarinet and Orchestra 2001
 Concerto for Alto Saxophone and String Orchestra 2009
 ...in Brief, concert band 2013
 Dansatelle, piano and string orchestra 2017
 Piano Concerto 2, piano, small orchestra 2017
 Concerto for Trumpet, Winds and Percussion, trumpet, wind orchestra 2018

Orchestra

 Auspice Deo 1962
 Diversion for Orchestra 1970
 Land of Moinee 1983
 Tasmania Symphony - The Legend of Moinee 1988
 Infant Holy 1992
 Aestivernal 1996
 Symphony No.2 - 'The South Land 1996
 March for the Republic 2001
 Variations on the Drover's Song 2003
 Symphony No.3 - 'Affirmation 2007
 Symphony No.4 - 'The river and beyond 2016

Solo Instrumental

 25 Piano Pieces for young players piano 1961
 Piano Sonatina 1965
 Organ Sonata 1967
 Coolness, oboe, 1974
 For Shirley Harris, piano left hand 1981
 Cloud Patterns, viola 1988
 Water Pools, violin 1988
 Two Nature Pieces, violin 1989
 Two Nature Pieces, viola 1989
 Three Miniatures, piano 1989
 Wedding Day, piano 1989
 Two Mirror Pieces, marimba 1990
 In the Forest, piano 1991
 Idyll, cello 1992
 Introduction and Scherzo, piano 1993
 Legend, piano 1993
 More Miniatures for Piano 1993
 Threes and Twos, piano 1994
 Four Nature Pieces, cello 1994
 Dance Rituals, piano 1997
 Cradle Song for Emma, piano 1997
 Dance Rondo, guitar 1997
 Bird Chants, piano 1998
 Sonata no.1 for piano, piano 1998
 Melody, cello 1998
 Looking North from Tier Hill, piano 1999
 Three Lullabies, piano 1999
 Blue Sky through Still Trees, piano 1999
 Different Worlds, piano 1999
 Bird Chants II, piano 1999
 45 for Russell, piano 2001
 Dance Rondo II, guitar 2001
 5 - Alive! - 0, piano 2002
 Birthday at Rosemour Farm, piano 2002
 In Memorium - Malcolm Williamson, piano 2004
 Rosemour Idyll, piano 2005
 Now I'm Seven, piano 2006
 Sonata no.2 for piano - 'From My Inner Nature''' 2006
 Sonata no.3 for piano - 'Capsules 2007
 Sonata no.4 for piano - 'End Notes 2007
 Simple Gifts (3 Short Pieces), piano 2007
 Sonata no.5 for piano - 'Full Circle 2008
 Lazy Summer, piano 2008
 Sonata no.6 for piano - 'On D, piano 2010
 Sonata no.7 for piano - 'Of the Night, piano 2010
 Black Mary - 'A Portrait, piano 2011
 Lullaby for Alice, piano 2011
 Piano Sonata 8, piano 2014
 Intermezzo for Frances, piano 2015
 Bird Chants III, piano 2017
 Sonata no.9 for piano - 'The Call, piano 2018
 Extraordinary byways, piano 2019
 Sonata no.10 for piano - '- my answer to a question', piano 2019

Voice

 Six out of door songs, baritone and piano 1955-57
 By Wenlock Town, baritone and piano 1958
 Five Songs for Bartitone and Piano, baritone and piano 1961
 Four Songs from Robert Graves, high voice, piano 1964
 Five Herrick Epigrams, soprano, alto, piano 1964
 A 12th Night Interlude, baritone, string orchestra 1965
 A Lute with three Strings, voice, flute 1966
 Quiet Waters, high voice, string quartet 1980
 Quiet Waters, high voice, piano (rehearsal score) 1980
 Songs and interludes from 'The Golden Crane, soprano, clarinet, piano 1984
 Tasmania, SSAA choir 1989
 Four Miscellaneous Songs, bass baritone, piano 1991
 Two Encore Songs, voice, piano 1991
 Five Early Songs, voice, piano 1994
 Night Images, voice, clarinet, piano 1995
 Southern People and Places, voice, cello, piano 1998
 The Partridge Garden, voice/flute, piano 1998
 The Night Piece, voice, piano 2000
 The Ballad of Van Deimen's Land, choir, windband 2004
 Four Bird Songs from Shaw Neilson, baritone, piano 2005
 Five Songs from Robert Graves, high voice, piano 2008
 Aspects of the Vine, high voice, viola, double bass 2010
 Bird Songs, high voice, string quintet/orchestra 2011
 Lullaby, soprano, piano, 2012
 Lost and present love, baritone, piano, 2012
 Menagerie of birds, baritone, piano, clarinet, horn, violin, viola, violoncello 2012
 Four Reflective Songs, baritone, piano 2014
 The Earth Song (on words and melody by Bob Brown), soprano solo, SATB choir, orchestra 2014
 Country, baritone, oboe, piano 2015
 Three Penguin Summers, male voice, orchestra 2016
 The Muse - a fairy tale, male voice, windband 2017
 Envoy, voice, piano 2018
 Conflagration - 'a cantata in eight episodes, for SATB soloists, chorus, two pianos and six percussionists, 2019

Choral

 I sing of a Maiden, ATB choir (unaccommpanied) 1958
 Three Unison Songs, mixed voices and piano 1958
 Songs of Come and Gone, SSA choir, flute, piano, strings 1963
 The Battel (arr. Byrd), school choir and orchestra 1963
 Two Monodies for Male Chorus 1963
 Two Australian Choral Pieces, SATB choir 1963
 The Shepherd, SSA choir 1964
 De Profundis, SATB choir 1964
 Three for Three, SAB choir 1965
 O Waly, Waly, TTBB choir 1966
 To Musick, SSA choir, cello, piano 1968
 Two songs for 'The Witnesses 1970
 The Wild Mountain Thyme, SSA choir, flute 1971
 Four Australian Folk Songs, SSA choir 1971
 Seven Songs from Shaw Neilson, SSA choir, flute, bassoon 1972
 Two Australian Folk Songs, TTBB choir, piano 1974
 Ladies of Brisbane, arr. TTBB choir, piano 1974
 The Death of Ben Hall, arr. TTBB choir 1974
 Lament of the Aboriginies, SA choir, piano 1977
 There is an Island, children's choir, orchestra 1977
 Before Sleep, SATB ensemble 1977
 At night, SA choir, assorted instruments 1982
 Northward the Strait, soprano, baritone, chorus, symphonic wind band 1987
 Song of Welcome, youth choir, symphonic wind band 1990
 Time Moods, a capella chamber choir 1991
 Gloria, youth choir, orchestra 1992
 Songs of Greeting and Farewell, youth choir 1996
 Excerpts (Three Songs), SSAA choir, piano 1996
 To Musick, SATB choir, cello, piano 2004
 Her Passion Tells, soprano, baritone, SATB chorus, strings 2006
 Northward the Strait (Extended Version), soprano, baritone, SATB chorus, orchestra 2007
 Northward the Strait (Extended Version), soprano, baritone, SATB chorus, symphonic wind band 2009

Theatre

 Incidental Music for 'Twelfth Night, string quartet and baritone 1960
 Incidental Music and Shanties for 'Treasure Island 1962
 Incidental Music for 'The Imaginary Invalid, flute, viola, cello, piano 1969
 Incidental Music for 'Hansel and Gretel, flute, oboe, cello, harpsichord, percussion 1970
 Incidental Music for 'The Wakefield Plays''', flute, 3 trumpets, trombone, violin, percussion, electronics, choir 1972
 Incidental Music and Songs for 'The Journey, flute, oboe, trumpet, cello, harpsichord, percussion 1972
 Incidental Music for 'Richard II, 2 violins, cello, 2 trumpets, timpani 1972
 Incidental Music for 'Once a Jolly Swagman, flute, clarinet, cello, harpsichord, percussion, prepared tape 1973
 Incidental Music for 'Click go the shears, flute, clarinet, violin, trumpet, cello, harpsichord/piano, percussion 1975
 Incidental Music for 'Big Nose, cello, percussion 1976
 Incidental Music for 'Rub-a-dub-dub, oboe, cello, percussion 1976
 Incidental Music for 'Ice Palais 1989

Film
 Upon Reflection, violin, bassoon 1971
 Fountain, flute, viola, cello 1972
 By hook or by crook, string quartet 1973
 Walka crooked mile, string quartet 1975
 Ross Bridge, clarinet, string quartet, percussion 1977
 River of Lost Footsteps, flute, violin, cello, percussion 2000

Opera
 Rapunzel, opera for children's theatre, soloists, chorus, ensemble 1966
 The Golden Crane, vocal score 1983
 The Golden Crane, solo voices, chorus, chamber orchestra 1984
 The Bushranger's Lover, 5 principal solo voices, mixed chorus, flute, oboe, clarinet, bassoon, horn, trumpet, trombone, percussionist, piano, strings 2012
 Memento Mori, 2 principal solo voices, violin, violoncello, piano, 2018

References

External links
Australian Music Centre biography
Move Records biography
Tasmania Symphony - The Legend of Moinee score and recording excerpts at the Australian Music Centre
Don Kay channel at youtube

1933 births
People educated at Launceston Church Grammar School
20th-century classical composers
21st-century classical composers
Australian male classical composers
Living people
Members of the Order of Australia
Musicians from Tasmania
Australian opera composers
People from Hobart
20th-century Australian male musicians
20th-century Australian musicians
21st-century Australian male musicians
21st-century Australian musicians